Hippy Was Gipsy is a South Korean R&B duo consisting of members Jflow and Sep. They debuted in 2016 with the EP Island, and have since released three full-length albums: Tree (2017), Language (2018), and Empty Hands (2018). Tree won awards for best R&B album at both the 2018 Korean Music Awards and the 2018 Korean Hip-hop Awards.

Discography

Studio albums

Extended plays

Awards and nominations

Korean Hip-hop Awards

Korean Music Awards

References

External links 

 Hippy Was Gipsy on Facebook

Musical groups established in 2016
South Korean musical duos
South Korean contemporary R&B musical groups
Korean Music Award winners
2016 establishments in South Korea